Lac de Créteil (Lake Creteil in English) is an artificial lake of about 40 hectares located in Créteil (Val-de-Marne), Paris. This is an old quarry reconverted into a lake in the mid-1970s.

This site is served by the Pointe du Lac metro station.

At the beginning of 1968, the project began.  The work of development of the surroundings of the lake lasted until 1988. 

Since 2003, the management of the House of Nature has been entrusted to the Nature and Society association. 

In 2001, botulism germs were found in corpses of swans and fish, which resulted in the suspension of the authorisation to fish until 2004.

Creteil
Geography of Val-de-Marne